The Veritable Records of the Joseon Dynasty (also known as the Annals of the Joseon Dynasty or the True Record of the Joseon Dynasty;   and  ) are the annual records of Joseon, the last royal house to rule Korea. Kept from 1392 to 1865, the annals (or sillok) comprise 1,893 volumes and are thought to be the longest continual documentation of a single dynasty in the world. With the exception of two sillok compiled during the colonial era, they are the 151st national treasure of South Korea and listed in UNESCO's Memory of the World registry.

Since 2006, the annals have been digitized by the National Institute of Korean History and are available on the internet with modern Korean translation in hangul and the original text in Classical Chinese. In January 2012, the National Institute of Korean History announced a plan to translate them to English by the year 2033. The work was scheduled to start in 2014 with an initial budget of ₩500 million, but it was estimated that an allocation of ₩40 billion is needed to complete the project.

Compilation
During the reign of a monarch, professional historiographers maintained extensive records on national affairs and the activities of the state. They collected documents and wrote daily accounts that included state affairs as well as diplomatic affairs, the economy, religion, meteorological phenomena, the arts, and daily life, among other things. These daily accounts became the Sacho ("Draft History").  Great care was taken to ensure the neutrality of the historiographers, who were also officials with legal guarantees of independence. Nobody was allowed to read the Sacho, not even the king, and any historiographer who disclosed its contents or changed the content could be punished with beheading. These strict regulations lend great credibility to these records.     

Yet at least one king, tyrannical Yeonsangun, looked into the Annals, and this led to the First Literati Purge of 1498, in which one recorder and five others were cruelly executed because of what was written in the Sacho. This incident led to greater scrutiny to prevent the king from seeing the Annals.  In the Later Joseon period when there was intense conflict between different political factions, revision or rewriting of sillok by rival factions took place, but they were identified as such, and the original version was preserved.   
 
The original recorders recorded every word and act of the king in the Sacho although not all details were included in the final version. For instance, King Taejong fell from a horse one day and immediately told those around him not to let a recorder know about his fall.  A recorder wrote both Taejong's fall and his words not to record it.  In another instance, Taejong was recorded as complaining about a recorder who eavesdropped on him behind a screen and followed him to a hunt under a disguise.

Upon the death of a king and the coronation of his successor, the Sillokcheong ("Office for Annals Compilation") used the Sacho to begin compilation of his annals.

The Annals of the first three kings of the Joseon dynasty, those of Taejo (r.1392–1398), Jeongjong (r.1399–1400), and Taejong (r. 1401–1418), were hand-written manuscripts. Later annals, from the Annals of Sejong (r. 1418–1450) onwards, were printed with movable metal and wooden type, which was unprecedented in the making of annals in Japan and China.

Four separate repositories were established in Chunchugwan, Chungju County, Jeonju County, and Seongju County to store copies of the Annals.  All but the repository in Jeonju were burned down during the Imjin wars.  After the war, five more copies of the Annals were produced and stored in Chunchugwan and the mountain repositories of Myohyang-san, Taebaeksan, Odaesan, and Mani-san.  The Chunchugwan copy was lost in 1624, due to the treason of Yi Gwal. Part of the Mani-san copy was lost during the Manchu invasion (1636), and the surviving volumes moved to Jeongjok-san in 1678. The Myohyang-san copy was moved to Jeokseong-san in 1633.  During the colonial era, the Japanese moved the Odae-san copy to Tokyo University, but most of the copy was soon lost in the Great Kantō earthquake of 1923. 47 books have remained, and in July 2006, the copy returned to South Korea.

The Annals are written in Classical Chinese; they were translated into modern Korean in the 1980s in North Korea and in 1994 in South Korea. Parts of the Annals of the Joseon Dynasty have been scanned by Seoul National University and are available online.

Annals excluded from the collection
The annals of the last two Joseon rulers, Gojong sillok (Veritable Records of Gojong) and Sunjong sillok (Veritable Records of Sunjong), have been excluded from the Annals of the Joseon Dynasty. The Gojong sillok ends on July 19, 1907 (when Gojong abdicated), while Sunjong sillok ends on August 29, 1910 (the time when the Japan–Korea Treaty of 1910 became effective). There is also an "addendum" Sunjong sillok bulok (순종실록부록) which ends on July 6, 1928, when, according to the tradition, the Spirit tablets of late Sunjong and Empress Sunmyeong were placed into Jongmyo as the filial mourning (for the death of Emperor Sunjong) was due.

Written during the Japanese occupation of Korea, Gojong sillok and Sunjong sillok are regarded as "unreliable documents" by Korean academics because of the influence of Japanese officials on their compilation as well as the falsification of historical events.  Although they have been included in the National Institute of Korean History's modern Korean translation as the Annals of the Last Two Emperors of the Joseon Dynasty, they are not considered part of the Annals of the Joseon Dynasty and are not included in the National Treasures of South Korea or UNESCO's Memory of the World register.

Content

See also
Samguk Sagi
Samguk Yusa
Goryeosa
Seungjeongwon ilgi
Office of the Yi Dynasty

References

External links

 The official website showing the original text as well as the translation in Korean Hangul (National Institute of Korean History)
 Veritable Records of the Ming Dynasty, Joseon Dynasty & Qing Dynasty (Academia Sinica)
 Kyujanggak Online : The 5th column lists Annals of the Joseon Dynasty
 Annals of the Choson Dynasty-UNESCO Memory of the World Register

Korean chronicles
History books about Korea
House of Yi
Joseon dynasty works
National Treasures of South Korea
1413 establishments in Asia
Memory of the World Register
15th-century establishments in Korea
Chinese-language literature of Korea